Varpu Lindström (1948–2012) was a historian and educator.  She was the leading expert on the social history of Finnish women in Canada.

Personal life and career
Born in Helsinki, she emigrated to Canada as a teen in 1963 with her family. She was a respected historian and professor of History and Women's Studies at York University. She founded the Canadian Friends of Finland friendship society in 1982, which encouraged cultural exchanges between the two countries. Her research contributed to the creation of Kelly Saxberg's 2004 historical documentary "Letters from Karelia" about the fate of Canadian Finns lured back to Soviet Karelia only to be killed in Stalinist purges of the 1930s.

Lindström died in 2012.

Selected publications

Awards and honours
 She was one of the first to receive York University's Atkinson Teaching Award in 1989.		 	
 In 1992, she was awarded the Knight of the Order of the White Rose of Finland, First Class, in recognition of outstanding service to Finland and Finnish Canadians.
 She received the Queen Elizabeth II Diamond Jubilee Medal 2012.
 The University of Toronto hosts an annual memorial lecture in her honour.

References

External links 
Letters from Karelia (2005). NFB.
Canadian Friends of Finland
Varpu Lindström fonds, Clara Thomas Archives & Special Collections, York University Libraries.

Finnish emigrants to Canada
Social historians
Canadian women historians
20th-century Canadian historians
1948 births
2012 deaths
Order of the White Rose of Finland